Irish Songs, Country Style is a studio album by American country singer–songwriter Hank Locklin. It was released in January 1964 via RCA Victor Records and was produced by Chet Atkins. Irish Songs, Country Style was a collection of traditional Irish songs recorded in a country fashion. It was one of several concept albums Locklin recorded during the course of his career. The album was largely inspired by his popularity in Ireland.

Background and content
By the early 1960s, Hank Locklin had become a successful recording artist. He had several major hits, including "Please Help Me, I'm Falling," "Geisha Girl" and "Send Me the Pillow That You Dream On." Many of these hits also became successful in Europe, particularly in the United Kingdom and Ireland. In 1963, he embarked on a successful tour of Ireland where his shows drew large crowds. Locklin became so successful in Ireland, that he became inspired to record an album of traditional Irish songs. Locklin was also of Irish descent and believed the album would pay tribute to ancestry.

Locklin recorded the album once returning to the United States. The sessions were cut in Nashville, Tennessee at the RCA Victor Studio. It was produced by Chet Atkins, who had also recorded Locklin's previous seven albums. The session musicians chosen for the recorded were part of The Nashville A-Team, which included Floyd Cramer, Grady Martin and The Jordanaires. Irish Songs, Country Style was a collection of twelve tracks, all of which were traditional Irish songs recorded in a country fashion. Songs on the album included "The Old Bog Road," "Danny Boy" and "Galway Bay."

Release and reception

Irish Songs, Country Style was released in January 1964 via RCA Victor Records. It was Locklin's eighth studio release in his career. The project was distributed as a vinyl LP, containing six songs on either side of the record. No known singles were spawned from the album, unlike Locklin's previous studio releases. In later years, it received a less favorable rating from Allmusic, who only gave it 2.5 out of 5 stars. It was later released on a compact disc as part of a two-disc compilation set that also included various songs from his years at RCA Victor. This particular compilation received a favorable response from reviewer, Steve Leggett, who praised Locklin's voice and musical legacy. "Possessing a clear tenor voice and a knack as a songwriter for emotionally direct and deceptively simple songs, Hank Locklin was a bridge between country's rustic honky tonk roots and the lusher, modern pop sound of country that Nashville ushered in during the 1960s," he commented.

Track listing

Vinyl version

Digital version
{{tracklist
| headline        = Irish Songs, Country Style
| title1          = The Old Bog Road
| writer1         = 
| length1         = 2:57
| title2          = Too-Ra-Loo-Ra-Loo-Ral
| writer2         = Royce Shannon
| length2         = 3:00
| title3          = Danny Dear
| writer3         = O'Donovan
| length3         = 3:00
| title4          = If Only We Had Ireland Over Here
| writer4         = Traditional
| length4         = 2:46
| title5          = I'll Take You Home Again, Kathleen
| writer5         = Thomas Paine Westendorf
| length5         = 2:14
| title6          = My Wild Irish Rose
| writer6         = Olcott
| length6         = 2:09
| title7          = Danny Boy
| writer7         = Weatherly
| length7         = 2:24
| title8          = When Irish Eyes Are Smiling
| writer8         = 
| length8         = 2:19
| title9          = A Little Bit of Heaven
| writer9         = 
| length9         = 2:20
| title10         = Galway Bay
| writer10        = Colahan
| length10        = 2:40
| title11         = Kevin Barry
| writer11        = Unknown
| length11        = 2:30
| title12         = Forty Shades of Green
| writer12        = Cash
| length12        = 2:59
}}

Personnel
All credits are adapted from the liner notes of Irish Songs, Country Style.''

Musical personnel
 Brenton Banks – strings
 George Binkley – strings
 Cecil Brower – strings
 Floyd Cramer – piano
 Ray Edenton – guitar
 Lillian Hunt – strings
 The Jordanaires – background vocals
 Jerry Kennedy – guitar
 Buddy Harman – drums
 Grady Martin – guitar
 Booker Rowe – strings

Technical personnel
 Chet Atkins – producer
 Bill Porter – engineer

Release history

References

1964 albums
Albums produced by Chet Atkins
Hank Locklin albums
RCA Victor albums